Saroja (stylised as Sa-Ro-Ja) is a 2008 Indian Tamil-language comedy thriller film written and directed by Venkat Prabhu and produced by T. Siva. It stars Shiva, Vaibhav, Premji, S. P. B. Charan, and Vega Tamotia, while Jayaram, Prakash Raj, Sampath Raj, Nikita Thukral, Bose Venkat and Kajal Aggarwal play other vital roles. Several other popular Tamil television artists and crew members make special appearances throughout the film. The score and soundtrack were composed by Yuvan Shankar Raja with cinematography by Sakthi Saravanan.

The film follows the journey of four young men who travel from Chennai to Hyderabad to watch a cricket match. Due to a road accident, they are forced to take a diversion off the main road to arrive on time. This leads them to a gang who have kidnapped a schoolgirl, Saroja, the only daughter of a millionaire.

The film was released on 5 September 2008 to very positive reviews and critical acclaim, while also emerging a high commercial success. It was dubbed and partially reshot in Telugu with Srihari reprising Jayaram's role. This film was based on Judgement Night

Plot

Ajay Raj, Ganesh Kumar, and brothers Ram Babu and Jagapathi Babu are close friends who spend a lot of time together in Chennai. Ajay is a television actor, Ganesh is a fun-loving engineering student who falls in love with every woman he sees, Jagapathi is an engineer who is married and has a six-year-old daughter, and Ram is Jagapathi's younger brother who lives with him. Ram is in love with Pooja, but before he has a chance to tell her, Pooja tells Ram that she is in love with Ajay. Pooja and Ajay eventually get engaged, leaving Ram heartbroken. He soon forgets his grief and has a good time with Ajay, Ganesh, and Jagapathi. One day, the four friends decide to go in Ajay's old ramshackle Volkswagen Samba to Hyderabad to watch a cricket match.

Vishwanath is a business tycoon in Hyderabad who has no time for his wife and teenage daughter Saroja. One day, Saroja is kidnapped, and the police enter the scene, with Vishwanath's friend ACP Ravichandran handling the case.

Meanwhile, a huge tanker lorry carrying highly inflammable and dangerous chemicals overturns on the National Highway between Chennai and Hyderabad and the four friends are stuck in a massive traffic jam. They attempt to take a shortcut to Hyderabad, but they end up in a dark, desolate area where their real troubles begin.

After arguing about which direction to take at a crossroad, Ajay convinces the others to drive into a forest, receiving instructions from Venkat Prabhu in a cameo appearance. As they proceed further, an injured man named R. Venkatraman suddenly falls on their car from above. Wanting to save Venkatraman, Jagapathi asks Ganesh and Ram to ask for help in a nearby building. Ajay, horrified by Venkatraman's bullet wounds, is even more shocked when he urges Jagapathi and Ajay to escape. Jagapathi, however, attempts to save Venkatraman, who repeatedly urges them to leave quickly.

A few men arrive in a jeep and shoot at them from a distance. Ajay rushes to the driver's seat and attempts to flee from the area. Their van gets hit by the other vehicle and is overturned, throwing Venkatraman outside. Ajay and Jagapathi remain inside the van. Sampath Kumar, the leader of the gang in the black jeep, steps out of his vehicle and shoots Venkatraman after a short conversation. Sampath then discovers that two men (Jagapathi and Ajay) had attempted to save the injured man; he orders his henchmen to kill them. Upon hearing Sampath's order, Ajay and Jagapathi run for their lives.

Meanwhile, Ganesh and Ram have entered an abandoned factory in search of help. Finding the place empty, they walk out and wander around for some time. They soon reach the place where the van had overturned and realize that their friends are missing. At the same time, Ajay and Jagapathi are trapped inside a room within close range of one of the hitmen and escape narrowly. Ganesh and Ram continue to search the area for their friends and eventually find them after fighting with a few hitmen. Realizing that they are caught in a dangerous situation, all four run away from the factory toward the distant sound of a train. They barely manage to board the last car. Jagapathi does not board the train; he sees that his pocket has been torn, and he deduces that his wallet had fallen somewhere inside the factory. Ajay and Ram frantically attempt to convince Jagapathi to board the train. Jagapathi fears that the assassins might cause problems for his wife and child, since his wallet (containing his identity) might be in the hands of the gangsters. Thus, all four friends return to the factory to recover the lost wallet.

After a short argument in which the frightened Ajay hesitates to go along with Jagapathi to the factory, Ganesh is pushed to accompany him. Jagapathi and Ganesh enter the room where the wallet was dropped. One of the gangsters momentarily walks into the room, in the view of Ganesh. Ganesh hides and tries to warn Jagapathi to stay out of sight. When Jagapathi finds the wallet and turns around, he realizes that Ganesh has disappeared. After searching the room thoroughly, Jagapathi decides to leave. When he walks out, Ajay and Ram are waiting alone, and there is no sign of Ganesh. This sparks off another argument; Ajay asserts that he would not leave the place without Ganesh. Meanwhile, it is revealed that Ganesh had wandered into another room to save himself. Finding Saroja tied up inside, he frees her and explains to her that he is not a member of the gang. In his usual manner, he falls in love and tries to impress her. Saroja and Ganesh then sneak out of the room. The other three set out to rescue Ganesh but get caught in the process.

Sampath continues to demand money from Vishwanath to release his daughter. Ravichandran consoles Vishwanath and does all that he can to help rescue Saroja. Meanwhile, the gangsters taunt the three men whom they have captured and continue to do so until Kalyani, Sampath's girlfriend, walks in and informs the group that Saroja has escaped. Sampath sends all of his men to find the girl, leaving a single gangster with the three captives. Ram attacks the gangster and kills him. They run out of the factory and catch up with Ganesh and Saroja. They are soon trapped in a building with a single entry. The henchmen follow them and await them in front. The friends are convinced that the only way to escape is to fight the gangsters. Suddenly, Jagapathi comes up with the idea of designing a contraption using objects in the building as weapons in a grand Rube Goldberg machine. In the meantime, Sampath asks Vishwanath to come to the area at once to take his daughter in exchange for the ransom money. Soon, Vishwanath and Ravichandran arrive, and Ravichandran is disguised as Vishwanath's driver.

The four friends and Saroja finally arrive at the railway station to escape. They soon realize to their horror that the railway station is actually the exact spot where Sampath is planning to collect the ransom money from Vishwanath and Ravichandran. Vishwanath and Ravichandran are standing on the other side of the tracks. Saroja leaves the hideout, crosses the tracks, and embraces Ravichandran out of relief.

Just as Vishwanath is overjoyed that his daughter is back in safe hands, Ravichandran pulls out a gun and points it at Saroja. At that moment, Vishwanath realizes that Ravichandran is actually the mastermind behind Saroja's abduction and that Sampath is just another henchman responsible for carrying out Ravichandran's orders. A flashback reveals that Ravichandran and Sampath are good friends and that they have long been jealous of Vishwanath for his social status and wealth.

In the nick of time, the heroes emerge from the hideout and fight the goons with all their might. Vishwanath finally shoots and kills Ravichandran, and Saroja is reunited with her family. As everyone returns home, the four friends try to recall the name of the girl whom they have just rescued.

Cast

              
 Shiva as Ajay Raj
 Premji as Ganesh Kumar
 Vaibhav as Ram Babu
 SPB Charan as Jagapathi Babu
 Vega Tamotia as Saroja  
 Jayaram as ACP V. Ravichandran
 Srihari as ACP V. Ravichandran (Telugu version)
 Prakash Raj as Vishwanath   
 Sampath Raj as A. Sampath Kumar
 Nikita as Kalyani
 Bose Venkat as Sub-Inspector R. Venkatraman
 Amritha as Lakshmi
 Ammu as Jagapathi's wife
 Nagendran as Nagandran 'Naaga'
 Ravikanth
 Krishna Moorthy
  
Special appearances by actors and crew members throughout the film by:
 Kajal Aggarwal as Pooja 
 Jai
 Ajay Raj as Bus Driver
 Aravind Akash
 Brahmanandam as Car passenger
 Deepa Venkat
 Fathima Babu  as Car passenger
 Ranina Reddy
 Inigo Prabhakaran as Bus Passenger
 Jayalakshmi
 Mai Prakash
 Nalini
 Nithin Sathya
 S. N. Surendar
 Sakthi Saravanan
 Shanmugasundaram
 Silva
 T. Siva
 Venkat Prabhu
 Vijay Vasanth
 Vijayalakshmi Ahathian
 Yuvan Shankar Raja as Club Singer
  
Special appearances by actors during the song "Aaja Meri Soniye" (in alphabetical order) by:
 Anandha Kannan
 Badava Gopi
 Chetan
 Deepak
 Dev
 Devadarshini
 Devipriya
 Divyadarshini
 George Vishnu
 Kamalesh
 Latha Rao
 M. S. Baskar
 Preethi
 Raadhika Sarathkumar
 Rajkamal
 Ranjitha
 Shreekumar
 Subbu Panchu
 Tinku
 Venkat
 Vishwa

Production
After the success of Chennai 600028, Venkatprabhu announced his next project in 2007 titled "Saroja" inspired from a hit song of his previous hit film. Film launch was held on 5 December at Green Park Hotel in Vadapalani, Chennai. Shruti Haasan and then Varalaxmi Sarathkumar were initially offered the role of the titular character but later rejected it. Jai wanted to appear in the film but director said big no as there is no scope for him; Jai accepted to play a small role. Venkatprabhu added that Saroja is a thriller. The film was partially reshot in Telugu and Srihari reprises the inspector role played by Jayaram in Tamil.

Soundtrack

After the success of Chennai 600028 (2007), director Venkat Prabhu teamed up with his cousin Yuvan Shankar Raja again for the musical score of Saroja. The soundtrack was released on 15 July 2008 at the Chennai Trade Center Convention Hall in Nandambakkam by composer A. R. Rahman. It features six tracks, out of which one song ("My Life") was designed as a promotional song, which would feature in television channels and popularize the film. The song, also composed by Yuvan Shankar Raja, was performed by Indian band Yodhakaa from Mumbai. The lyrics were provided by 'Kavignar' Vaali, Gangai Amaran and Yuvan Shankar Raja. The song "Cheeky Cheeky" was sung by Mathilda D'Silva, with Yuvan Shankar Raja and Nirdhiya, who was a contestant of the reality show Singapore Idol.

Critical response
The album received very positive reviews from critics, and the songs became widely popular. It was listed in many "Top 10 Albums of the Year" lists. "Dosth Bada Dosth" was a chartbuster, among the most frequently played songs, and became an anthem of friendship.

Release
Saroja received positive reviews worldwide. It was a huge commercial success as well, grossing almost 4 crores at the Chennai box office in 14 weeks according to the comparison website Behindwoods.com, thus making it Venkat Prabhu's second successive hit after Chennai 600028. The film completed 100 days all over Tamil Nadu, making it one of the blockbusters of 2008.

Sequel
A sequel to the film was announced during August 2016, which would be directed by Venkat Prabhu's assistant Skantha Priyan and written by Samaran. S. J. Surya, Premji and VTV Ganesh were reported to be portraying the lead roles.

References

External links
 Official Website
 
 Saroja songs at Raaga

Films shot in Telangana
2008 films
2000s comedy thriller films
Films directed by Venkat Prabhu
Films scored by Yuvan Shankar Raja
2000s Tamil-language films
Indian road movies
Indian comedy thriller films
Fictional portrayals of the Andhra Pradesh Police
Fictional portrayals of the Tamil Nadu Police
Films set in Hyderabad, India
2008 comedy films